Willow Springs Station was a changing station at Alamos or Willow Springs along the Second Division route of the Butterfield Overland Mail, in what is now Murrieta, in Riverside County, California.  It was also known as Alamos, Clines's or Kline's, or Willows, was one of the later Butterfield Overland Mail stations, placed in 1859, between some of the original stations for changing teams and providing water between stops in hot dry areas.  Willow Springs, also originally known as Alamos Springs, was located west of the hills that line the east side of the Temecula Valley, on land of the Rancho Temecula, near Santa Gertrudis Creek on the low flood plain of Murrieta Creek, between Santa Gertrudis and Warm Springs Creek.

History

Alamos Springs was originally a camping ground with good water on the Southern Emigrant Trail during the California Gold Rush.  In 1853, squatters David Cline (or Kline) and William Moody, started a ranch at these springs that was described by Benjamin Ignatius Hayes who visited it on January 14–15, 1861:

The station continued in use after the Overland Mail shut down, it remained in use during the American Civil War as a camp for Union Army troops.  Company D, 2nd Cavalry, California Volunteers was described at the Post at Kline's Ranch in the Spring of 1862 by Lt. Col. Richard C. Drum in his report of his tour of inspection of forces in Southern California.  With the grant of Rancho Temecula patented to Jean-Louis Vignes in 1860, Kline and Moody had failed to acquire title to the land and probably like many others lost their ranch during the Great Drought of 1863–64.

The site today 
Today the site is located within a business park near the present-day intersection of Cherry Avenue and Jefferson Avenue in Murrieta.  To the south, in Temecula, some open land of the Kline's Ranch still remains as a flood control basin, near Santa Gertrudis Creek with Alamos, (Populus sect. Aigeiros) still growing along the old creek bed.

References

Butterfield Overland Mail in California
American frontier